Greenheart may refer to:

Company
Greenheart Group, an international forestry company listed on the Hong Kong Stock Exchange

Plants
Chlorocardium rodiei (family Lauraceae), a tree native to Guyana in northern South America
Colubrina arborescens (family Rhamnaceae), a shrub native to Florida and the Caribbean
Lignum vitae, the heartwood of a tree of the genus Guaiacum
Warburgia ugandensis, also known as Uganda greenheart

Other uses
Groene Hart (English: Green Heart), a region of Holland
Greenheart phones, a range of cell phones by Sony Ericsson
The Greenheart Project, a Japanese environmental project